Mercer B. Barrows is an American television producer, art director, and writer. He is the father of the actress Samantha Barrows and the actor Mercer Barrows III, and the husband of Debbie Ware Barrows, a former producer of Days of Our Lives.

Credits
General Hospital (art director, 1993)
Port Charles (co-ordinating producer, 1997; main producer, 2003)
General Hospital (producer, 2002–2018; breakdown writer, January - March 2008)

Awards and nominations
Daytime Emmy awards:

Won, 1982, Outstanding Achievement in Design Excellence for a Daytime Drama Series for General Hospital 
Nominated, 2004, Outstanding Drama Series for "General Hospital 
Won, 2005, Outstanding Drama Series for General Hospital 
Won, 2006, Outstanding Drama Series for General Hospital''

External links

Year of birth missing (living people)
Living people
American television producers
American art directors
Barrows